Live at The Sahara in Las Vegas is a live album recorded by American singer Connie Francis.

Background
In May 1966, Connie Francis fulfilled one of her regular engagements at The Sahara Hotel in Las Vegas, appearing on stage at the hotel's Congo Room. Accompaniment was provided by The Lou Basil Orchestra under the direction of Joe Mazzu.

Six of these shows were recorded between May 13 and May 16 with the most suitable parts selected, edited and mixed in early October 1966 to create the album which was released later that same month. Three of the selections were not included into the final album and remain unreleased to this day.

Track listing

Side A

Side B

Not included selections

References

Connie Francis albums
1966 albums
Albums produced by Tom Wilson (record producer)
MGM Records albums
Albums recorded at SLS Las Vegas